Stefan Drogrishki (born 9 September 1994) is a Macedonian handball player who plays for GRK Ohrid and the Macedonian national team.

References

1994 births
Living people
Macedonian male handball players
Sportspeople from Bitola